The World Tag Team Championship was the original professional wrestling world tag team championship in the World Wrestling Entertainment (WWE) promotion, and the promotion's third tag team championship overall. Originally established by the then-World Wide Wrestling Federation (WWWF) on June 3, 1971 (renamed World Wrestling Federation in 1979), it served as the only title for tag teams in the promotion until the then-World Wrestling Federation (WWF) bought World Championship Wrestling (WCW) in March 2001, which added their tag team championship. Both titles were unified in November 2001, retiring WCW's championship and continuing WWF's.

In 2002, the company was renamed WWE. Following the introduction of the WWE brand extension, where wrestlers and championships became exclusive to a WWE brand, the World Tag Team Championship became exclusive to the Raw brand, while a second WWE Tag Team Championship was established for the SmackDown brand. Both titles were unified in 2009 into the "Unified WWE Tag Team Championship", but remained independently active until the World Tag Team Championship was decommissioned in 2010 in favor of continuing the newer championship.

The championship was contested in professional wrestling matches. Bouts for the title headlined WWF events including In Your House 3, Fully Loaded: In Your House, and 2001's Backlash. The inaugural champions were the team of Luke Graham and Tarzan Tyler, and the final champions were The Hart Dynasty.

History 
When the World Wide Wrestling Federation (WWWF) formed in 1963, their first tag team championship was the WWWF United States Tag Team Championship, which was originally an NWA championship established in 1958 and used by the WWWF's predecessor, Capitol Wrestling Corporation. After then-WWWF World Heavyweight Champion Bruno Sammartino and his tag team partner Spiros Arion won the titles in 1967, the U.S. Tag Team Championship was abandoned and deactivated due to Sammartino being the world champion. Two years later, The Rising Suns (Toru Tanaka and Mitsu Arakawa) arrived in the WWWF with the WWWF International Tag Team Championship, which they claimed to have won in a tournament in Tokyo in June of that year. This became the WWWF's tag team title until 1971 when The Rising Suns left the WWWF and took the titles with them.

The WWWF then established their own original world tag team championship, the "WWWF World Tag Team Championship" in 1971. Following the title's introduction, Luke Graham and Tarzan Tyler became the inaugural champions on June 3. In 1979, the title became known as the "WWF Tag Team Championship" when the promotion was renamed World Wrestling Federation (WWF). It was subsequently renamed "WWF World Tag Team Championship" in 1983, but was often referred to as the "WWF Tag Team Championship" for short.

In March 2001, the WWF purchased World Championship Wrestling (WCW) and its championships were now also defended on WWF programming. Soon after, "The Invasion" took place in which the WCW/ECW Alliance was ultimately dismantled. At the 2001 Survivor Series pay-per-view, the title was unified with the WCW Tag Team Championship in a steel cage match. Then-WCW Tag Team Champions, the Dudley Boyz, defeated then-WWF Tag Team Champions, the Hardy Boyz, and were named the last WCW Tag Team Champions, as that title was deactivated, while becoming the new WWF Tag Team Champions.

After the WWF/WWE name change in 2002, the championship was subsequently renamed "WWE Tag Team Championship". During the initial WWE brand extension, the WWE Tag Team Championship was assigned to the SmackDown! brand as the reigning champions at the time of the initial expansion, Billy and Chuck, were both drafted to SmackDown! together. In July of that year, shortly after defeating Hollywood Hulk Hogan and Edge for the titles, the reigning champion team of Lance Storm and Christian (The Un-Americans) left SmackDown! for Raw, leaving SmackDown! without a tag team title. As a result, then-SmackDown! General Manager Stephanie McMahon commissioned a new tag team title, also called the WWE Tag Team Championship, to be the exclusive tag team titles for the SmackDown! brand. With the introduction of the World Heavyweight Championship on the Raw brand after the WWE Championship became exclusive to SmackDown!, the WWE Tag Team Championship on Raw was renamed "World Tag Team Championship". This was done so that the names of both tag team titles would mirror the names of the top championships on their respective brands. When the WWE Championship and World Heavyweight Championship switched brands during the 2005 WWE draft lottery, however, neither of the tag team titles were renamed.

In late 2008 through early 2009, then-WWE Tag Team Champions The Colóns (Carlito and Primo) engaged in rivalry with then-World Tag Team Champions John Morrison and The Miz, with the two teams exchanging victories in non-title matches and retaining their respective titles against each other. On the March 17 episode of ECW on Syfy, it was announced that at WrestleMania 25, both teams would defend their titles against each other and the winning team would hold both titles. The Colóns defeated Morrison and Miz, and thus unified the titles into the "Unified WWE Tag Team Championship", although both championships remained independently active.

As the Unified WWE Tag Team Championship, the champions could appear and defend the titles on any WWE brand, regardless of the brand that the holders belonged to. On August 16, 2010, the World Tag Team Championship was decommissioned in favor of continuing the lineage of the WWE Tag Team Championship (which dropped the "unified" moniker), following Bret Hart's presentation of new championship belts to then and final World Tag Team Champions, The Hart Dynasty (David Hart Smith and Tyson Kidd).

Brand designation history 
Following the events of the WWE brand extension, an annual WWE draft was established, in which select members of the WWE roster were reassigned to a different brand. After the World Tag Team Championship was unified with the WWE Tag Team Championship as the Unified WWE Tag Team Championship, the champions could appear and defend the titles on any WWE brand.

Reigns 

The inaugural champions were Crazy Luke Graham and Tarzan Tyler, who defeated Dick the Bruiser and The Sheik on June 3, 1971. The record for longest reign was held by Demolition, whose first reign lasted 478 days. Three teams tied for a record with shortest reigns. Jules Strongbow and Chief Jay Strongbow had their titles taken away shortly after winning them on June 28, 1982 when it was determined that Mr. Fuji, one half of the reigning champions with Mr. Saito, was pinned with a foot on the ropes. Owen Hart and Yokozuna lost their titles on September 25, 1995, to the Smoking Gunns shortly after having the titles returned to them. On March 19, 2001, Edge and Christian defeated The Hardy Boyz to win the titles only to lose them later that night to The Dudley Boyz.

The Dudley Boyz held the record for most reigns as a team with eight. Edge held the record for overall reigns as an individual with 12, seven with Christian. He also won the titles with Hulk Hogan, Chris Benoit, Randy Orton, and Chris Jericho (after the titles were unified).

The final champions were The Hart Dynasty (David Hart Smith and Tyson Kidd), who won the titles from ShoMiz (Big Show and The Miz) on the April 26, 2010 episode of Raw. After the World Tag Team Championship was deactivated, the duo continued to serve as the WWE Tag Team Champions until their loss at Night of Champions on September 19, 2010, to Drew McIntyre and Cody Rhodes.

References 
 General
 
 
 Specific

External links 
 WWE Unified World Tag Team Championship History at The Wrestling Archive

WWE tag team championships